Burnin' Beat is a 1962 studio album by drummers Buddy Rich and Gene Krupa, the sequel to their 1955 album Krupa and Rich.

Track listing 
LP side A
 "Jumpin' at the Woodside" (Count Basie) – 2:20
 "It Don't Mean a Thing (If It Ain't Got That Swing)" (Duke Ellington, Irving Mills) – 2:35
 "Duet" – 4:32
 "Night Train" (Oscar Washington / James R Forrest / Lewin C Simpkins) – 3:21
 "King Porter Stomp" (Jelly Roll Morton) – 3:24
LP side B
 "Perdido" (Ervin Drake, Hans J. Lengsfelder, Juan Tizol) – 2:24
 "Evolution" – 9:20
 "Hawaiian War Chant" (Ralph Freed, Leleiohaku, Ray Noble) – 5:30

Personnel 
 Gene Krupa - drums
 Buddy Rich - drums
 Danny Bank - flute
 John Bunch - piano
 Don Goldie - trumpet
 Al Stewart - trumpet
 Norman Granz - producer
 Nick Travis - trumpet
 Joe Wilder - trumpet

References 

 Verve V/V6 8471

Verve Records albums
Albums produced by Norman Granz
Buddy Rich albums
Gene Krupa albums
1962 albums